Allá donde muere el viento (Where The Wind Dies) is a 1976 Argentine drama film directed by Fernando Siro and written by Enrique Torres. The film stars John Russell, Tippi Hedren and Mala Powers.

Other cast
 María Aurelia Bisutti
 Tom Castronuova
 Robert Dore
 Valeria Franco
 Ovidio Fuentes
 Inda Ledesma
 Enrique Liporace
 Nelly Panizza
 Ignacio Quirós
 Carlos La Rosa

Release
The film premiered in 1976.

References

External links
 

1976 films
English-language Argentine films
1976 drama films
Argentine drama films
1970s English-language films
1970s Argentine films